Oochoristica gymnophthalmicola is a species of gastrointestinal cestodes that completes its life cycle in lizards, first found in Panama.

References

Further reading
Bursey, Charles R., Stephen R. Goldberg, and Laurie J. Vitt. "Helminths of Cnemidophorus ruthveni (Squamata: Teiidae) from Bonaire, Netherlands Antilles, with Description of A New Species of Alaeuris (Nematoda: Pharyngodonidae)." Journal of Parasitology 98.4 (2012): 795–800.

Cestoda
Parasites of lizards